Rouvres-en-Woëvre is a commune in the Meuse department in Grand Est in northeastern France.

See also
 Etain-Rouvres Air Base
 Communes of the Meuse department

References

Rouvresenwoevre